The 1964 Dallas Cowboys season was their fifth in the league. The team improved on their previous output of 4–10, winning five games. They failed to qualify for the playoffs for the fifth consecutive season. The Cowboys would not have another losing season until 1986.

Offseason

NFL Draft

Schedule

Conference opponents are in bold text

Game Summaries

Week 4: at Cleveland Browns

Week 6: vs. Cleveland Browns

Standings

Season recap
With one year left on his original contract, Tom Landry is re-signed to an additional 10-year extension, in effect giving him an 11-year deal, the longest in major pro sports history in the United States.

Roster

References

External links
1964 Dallas Cowboys season

Dallas Cowboys seasons
Dallas Cowboys
Dallas Cowboys